Camelids are members of the biological family Camelidae, the only currently living family in the suborder Tylopoda. The seven extant members of this group are: dromedary camels, Bactrian camels, wild Bactrian camels,  llamas, alpacas, vicuñas, and guanacos. Camelids are even-toed ungulates classified in the order Cetartiodactyla, along with species like whales, pigs, deer, cattle, and antelopes.

Characteristics

Camelids are large, strictly herbivorous animals with slender necks and long legs. They differ from ruminants in a number of ways. Their dentition show traces of vestigial central incisors in the incisive bone, and the third incisors have developed into canine-like tusks. Camelids also have true canine teeth and tusk-like premolars, which are separated from the molars by a gap. The musculature of the hind limbs differs from those of other ungulates in that the legs are attached to the body only at the top of the thigh, rather than attached by skin and muscle from the knee upwards. Because of this, camelids have to lie down by resting on their knees with their legs tucked underneath their bodies. They have three-chambered stomachs, rather than four-chambered ones; their upper lips are split in two, with each part separately mobile; and, uniquely among mammals, their red blood cells are elliptical. They also have a unique type of antibodies, which lack the light chain, in addition to the normal antibodies found in other mammals. These so-called heavy-chain antibodies are being used to develop single-domain antibodies with potential pharmaceutical applications.

Camelids do not have hooves; rather, they have two-toed feet with toenails and soft foot pads (Tylopoda is Greek for "padded foot"). Most of the weight of the animal rests on these tough, leathery sole pads. The South American camelids have adapted to the steep and rocky terrain by adjusting the pads on their toes to maintain grip. The surface area of Camels foot pads can increase with increasing velocity in order to reduce pressure on the feet and larger members of the camelid species will usually have larger pad area to help distribute weight across the foot. Many fossil camelids were unguligrade and probably hooved, in contrast to all living species.

Camelids are behaviorally similar in many ways, including their walking gait, in which both legs on the same side are moved simultaneously. While running, camelids engage a unique "running pace gait" in which limbs on the same side move in the same pattern they walk, with both left legs moving and then both right, this ensures that the fore and hind limb will not collide while in fast motion. During this motion there is a moment where all four limbs are off the ground at the same time. Consequently, camelids large enough for human beings to ride have a typical swaying motion.

Dromedary camels, bactrian camels, llamas, and alpacas are all induced ovulators.

The three Afro-Asian camel species have developed extensive adaptations to their lives in harsh, near-waterless environments. Wild populations of the Bactrian camel are even able to drink brackish water, and some herds live in nuclear test areas.

Comparative table of the seven extant species in the family Camelidae:

Evolution

Camelids are unusual in that their modern distribution is almost the inverse of their area of origin. Camelids first appeared very early in the evolution of the even-toed ungulates, around 50 to 40 million years ago during the middle Eocene, in present-day North America. Among the earliest camelids was the rabbit-sized Protylopus, which still had four toes on each foot. By the late Eocene, around 35 million years ago, camelids such as Poebrotherium had lost the two lateral toes, and were about the size of a modern goat.

The family diversified and prospered, but remained confined to the North American continent until only about two to three million years ago, when representatives arrived in Asia, and (as part of the Great American Interchange that followed the formation of the Isthmus of Panama) South America. A high arctic camel from this time period has been documented in the far northern reaches of Canada.

The original camelids of North America remained common until the quite recent geological past, but then disappeared, possibly as a result of hunting or habitat alterations by the earliest human settlers, and possibly as a result of changing environmental conditions after the last ice age, or a combination of these factors. Three species groups survived: the dromedary of northern Africa and southwest Asia; the Bactrian camel of central Asia; and the South American group, which has now diverged into a range of forms that are closely related, but usually classified as four species: llamas, alpacas, guanacos, and vicuñas.  Camelids were domesticated by early Andean peoples, and remain in use today.

Fossil camelids show a wider variety than their modern counterparts. One North American genus, Titanotylopus, stood 3.5 m at the shoulder, compared with about 2 m for the largest modern camelids. Other extinct camelids included small, gazelle-like animals, such as Stenomylus. Finally, a number of very tall, giraffe-like camelids were adapted to feeding on leaves from high trees, including such genera as Aepycamelus and Oxydactylus.

Whether the wild Bactrian camel (Camelus ferus) is in fact a distinct species or a subspecies (Camelus bactrianus ferus) is still debated. The divergence date is 0.7 million years ago, long before the start of domestication.

Scientific classification

Family Camelidae
 †Subfamily Poebrotheriinae
 †Subfamily Miolabinae
 †Subfamily Stenomylinae
 †Subfamily Floridatragulinae
 Subfamily Camelinae
 Tribe Lamini
 Genus: Lama
 Llama, Lama glama
 Guanaco, Lama guanicoe
 Alpaca, Lama pacos
 Vicuña, Lama vicugna
 Genus: Hemiauchenia
 †Hemiauchenia macrocephala
 †Hemiauchenia minima
 †Hemiauchenia blancoensis
 †Hemiauchenia vera
 †Hemiauchenia paradoxa
 Genus Palaeolama
 †Palaeolama mirifica
 Tribe Camelini
 Genus: Camelus
 Bactrian camel, Camelus bactrianus
 Dromedary, Camelus dromedarius
 Wild Bactrian camel, Camelus ferus
 †Syrian camel, Camelus moreli
 †Camelus sivalensis
Genus: Camelops
 †Camelops hesternus
Genus: Paracamelus
 †Paracamelus gigas

Phylogeny

Extinct genera

References

External links

 Pictures of camelid species

 
Extant Lutetian first appearances
Mammal families
Taxa named by John Edward Gray
Tylopoda